Berberidopsis is a genus of flowering plants in the small family Berberidopsidaceae.

Species
The genus contains two species:
 Berberidopsis beckleri - montane tape vine, of Australia.
 Berberidopsis corallina - coral plant of Chile, a threatened woody vine, locally known as voqui fuco. Its stems are used in traditional basketry by southern Mapuche people.

References

External links
 Pictures of Berberidopsis corallina in Chile.

Berberidopsidales
Eudicot genera
Taxa named by Joseph Dalton Hooker